John King Gordon  (1900–1989) was a Canadian Christian minister, editor, United Nations official, and academic.

Biography 
Gordon was born on 6 December 1900 in Winnipeg, Manitoba, the son of the novelist and future Presbyterian Church moderator Charles Gordon (known by the pen name "Ralph Connor") and his wife Helen King. He received a Bachelor of Arts degree from the University of Manitoba in 1920. A Rhodes scholar, he studied at The Queen's College, Oxford, from 1920 to 1921. Ordained in 1927, he was a United Church of Canada minister in Manitoba. From 1931  of Christian ethics at the United Theological College in Montreal. He was dismissed from the college in 1934 because of his socialist views. In 1935, he became a travelling professor of Christian ethics, working for the church's Board of Evangelism and Social Service. He became the secretary of the Fellowship for a Christian Social Order the same year. He was also involved with the League for Social Reconstruction.

Gordon married Ruth Anderson in 1939. They had two children, the journalist Charles Gordon and the journalist and novelist Alison Gordon.

In 1933, Gordon was one of the authors of the Regina Manifesto and was involved in the Co-operative Commonwealth Federation. From 1944 to 1947, he was managing editor of The Nation magazine. From 1947 to 1950, he was the United Nations correspondent for the Canadian Broadcasting Corporation (CBC). He also served as president of the United Nations Association in Canada circa 1975.

From 1962 to 1967, he taught international relations at the University of Alberta. He also taught at the University of Ottawa for six years.

In 1977, he was made a Member of the Order of Canada. He was the 1980 recipient of the Pearson Medal of Peace for his work in peacekeeping. He received honorary doctorates from the Brandon University (1974), Carleton University (1977), the University of Winnipeg (1979), St. Francis Xavier University (1981), and the University of Manitoba (1981). He died of a stroke on 24 February 1989 in Ottawa, Ontario.

See also 
 Salem Bland
 Tommy Douglas
 F. R. Scott

References

Footnotes

Bibliography

Further reading

External links 
 Pearson Medal of Peace - J. King Gordon
 J. King Gordon: ONUC - And What It Did for the Congo 
 J. King Gordon fonds (R2409) at Library and Archives Canada

1900 births
1989 deaths
20th-century Presbyterians
Academics in Manitoba
Alumni of The Queen's College, Oxford
Canadian Christian socialists
Canadian officials of the United Nations
Canadian people of Scottish descent
Canadian Presbyterians
Canadian Rhodes Scholars
Christian socialist theologians
Co-operative Commonwealth Federation politicians
Members of the Order of Canada
Ministers of the United Church of Canada
People from Winnipeg
Presbyterian socialists
Union Theological Seminary (New York City) alumni
Academic staff of the University of Alberta
University of Manitoba alumni